Sauchie Juniors Football Club are a Scottish football club based in the village of Sauchie, Clackmannanshire. Their home ground is Beechwood Park and club colours are red and white.

History 
Sauchie Junior Football Club began as Sauchie Juveniles, which was a league for players up to 27 years of age. Sauchie won the Scottish Cup four times (1951–52, 1956–57, 1957–58 and 1959–60). Having won every trophy possible as first class Juveniles, Jimmy Millar, the Secretary decided to go into the Junior grade. In the Club's second season as a Junior team, it won the East Region League Title in 1962–63, using mostly the Juvenile players.

Sauchie Juniors won the East Region St Michael's Cup twice, in 1972 and 1974. After winning the East Dryburgh Cup in Season 1982–83, the team went on to defeat the other Dryburgh winners (Sunnybank, East Kilbride Thistle and Auchinleck Talbot) to win the National Dryburgh Trophy.

After a barren spell, in season 2002–03 and then again in 2003–04 Sauchie won the Fife & Lothians Cup, defeating Glenrothes and then Linlithgow Rose the following season.

The furthest Sauchie has gone in the Scottish Junior Cup is the quarter-final, losing 4–2 away to Newtongrange Star in 1970, then again in 2004 when after a 0–0 draw at home to Glenrothes, Sauchie were defeated 3–2 in the replay.

In season 2001–02, a team composed mostly of Gairdoch United under 21s, under the guidance of Jan Woojek, brought Sauchie out of the doldrums. Willie Irvine and then Neil Duffy continued the growth with Alan McGonigal taking over until he moved on to Super league side Camelon.

The SJFA restructured prior to the 2006–07 season, and Sauchie found themselves in the 15-team East Region, South Division. They finished second in their first season in the division.

Grant Brough took over the reins in season 2008–09 finishing third in the league with his back room staff of Myles Allan and Scott Stenhouse. For the 2009–10 season Fraser Duncan and David Beaton took the team to fourth-place finish in the league and gave them a good grounding of what the Junior game is about. New signings were made for the start of the new season and a good blend of players came to Beechwood Park.

In 2011, the club won the East Region South Division to gain promotion to the Premier League. In Sauchie's first season in the Premier League, Duncan and his team won the league to gain promotion to the East Super League. After a best Super League finish of 5th in 2014-15, the club was relegated the following season but immediately gained promotion with a second Premier League title. 

In 2018 Sauchie were one of many clubs to move from the Junior leagues to the East of Scotland Football League.

Ground

Sauchie Juniors started playing at Fairfield Park, Sauchie, but built a new park for themselves – the present ground – Beechwood Park. This has been developed in 2003 with the building of a new stand, enclosure and erection of floodlights.

Ground Capacity: 5,000 (approx)
Covered Standing Area: 500 (approx)
Seated Stand: 200 (approx)
Bar/Function Suite Capacity: 100 (approx)

Players
Former players include Scotland international Alan Hansen and his brother John, who later played for Partick Thistle.  Former Celtic and Scotland player George Connelly ended his playing career at Sauchie Juniors.

Other former players include Joe Craig (Partick Thistle and Celtic), Jim Wallace (Dunfermline), and Paul McHale (Clyde and Dundee).

Honours 
East Region Premier League
Winners (2): 2011–12, 2016–17
East Region South Division winners: 2010–11

Fife & Lothians Cup winners: 2002–03, 2003–04

East of Scotland Junior Cup: 1982–83, 2013–14

References

External links
 Official club site
 Facebook
 Twitter

Football clubs in Scotland
Scottish Junior Football Association clubs
Association football clubs established in 1960
Football in Clackmannanshire
1960 establishments in Scotland
East of Scotland Football League teams
Alloa